Venus is an unincorporated community in southeastern Highlands County, Florida, United States.

Geography
Lake Placid is the nearest town to the north. Palmdale, another unincorporated community, is to the south. Hunting and fishing are popular recreations. Archbold Biological Station which includes natural Florida scrub is located here.

Tropical Storm Debby
On June 24, 2012, Venus was struck by an EF0 tornado spawned by Tropical Storm Debby, resulting in one death and property damage.

Businesses
Costa Delray Co., an indoor foliage plant greenhouse, is located here. 
Consolidated Citrus LP is located here.
The Venus Project has its research center located here, and is derived from the name of the community.

References

Unincorporated communities in Highlands County, Florida
Unincorporated communities in Florida